Cristian Lobato Villegas (born 7 March 1989) is a Spanish footballer who plays for CE L'Hospitalet as a left winger.

Club career

Barcelona
Born in Esparreguera, Barcelona, Catalonia, Lobato started playing football in FC Barcelona's La Masia, but he was released by the club still in his early teens, joining neighbours CE L'Hospitalet. He made his senior debut during the 2007–08 season in the Segunda División B, appearing in two games and suffering relegation.

In the 2009–10 campaign, Lobato was a very important first-team unit as Hospitalet returned to the third division. He then proceeded to play 33 league matches as the team retained their league status, already reconverted from left winger to left back.

In late June 2011, Lobato returned to his first club Barcelona, signing a two-year contract and being assigned to the reserves. Shortly after, he was called by main squad manager Pep Guardiola to the preseason, and he made his debut on 23 July against HNK Hajduk Split.

Lobato made his official debut for Barça B on 27 August 2011, playing 52 minutes in a 2–0 Segunda División home loss to Villarreal CF B. On 30 May 2013, his contract expired, and he was told that he would be released.

Later years
Lobato signed a five-year deal with Real Zaragoza in late January 2013, and underwent medical examinations in August after becoming a free agent. However, he failed to pass on his medical, and the contract was declared void in September.

On 7 January 2014, after spending the first part of the campaign nursing a knee injury, Lobato joined La Liga strugglers CA Osasuna for six months. He made his debut in the top flight of Spanish football on 3 February, coming on as a late substitute in a 3–1 defeat at Villarreal CF.

After seven months without a club, Lobato signed a short-term deal with Super League Greece side Asteras Tripolis F.C. on 12 February 2015. On 26 November, he agreed to a one-year contract with Gimnàstic de Tarragona after training with the team for nearly two months.

On 29 June 2017, Lobato joined Sporting Kansas City of the Major League Soccer until the end of the 2018 season. He returned to both his country and the third tier in February 2019, agreeing to a contract at UE Cornellà.

Career statistics

References

External links

1989 births
Living people
People from Esparreguera
Sportspeople from the Province of Barcelona
Spanish footballers
Footballers from Catalonia
Association football defenders
Association football wingers
La Liga players
Segunda División players
Segunda División B players
Tercera División players
Tercera Federación players
CE L'Hospitalet players
FC Barcelona Atlètic players
CA Osasuna players
Gimnàstic de Tarragona footballers
UE Cornellà players
Super League Greece players
Asteras Tripolis F.C. players
Major League Soccer players
USL Championship players
Sporting Kansas City players
Sporting Kansas City II players
Spanish expatriate footballers
Expatriate footballers in Greece
Expatriate soccer players in the United States
Spanish expatriate sportspeople in Greece
Spanish expatriate sportspeople in the United States